Raymond M. Kisor (born December 20, 1930) is an American politician who served in the New York State Assembly from the 98th district from 1979 to 1982.

References

1930 births
Living people
Republican Party members of the New York State Assembly